Leandro Gómez Harley (21 March 1902 – 18 April 1979) was an Uruguayan basketball player. He competed in the 1936 Summer Olympics.

References

External links

1902 births
1979 deaths
Uruguayan men's basketball players
Olympic basketball players of Uruguay
Basketball players at the 1936 Summer Olympics
Sportspeople from Montevideo
Place of death missing
20th-century Uruguayan people